Gary Jackson may refer to:

Gary Jackson (politician) (born 1950), American politician from Mississippi
Gary Jackson (Brookside), a character from the British television series Brookside
Gary Jackson (poet), American educator and poet
Gary Jackson, a character from the comic book Knights of the Dinner Table